Narva is a village (selo) in Khasansky District of Primorsky Krai, Russia, situated by the Narva River about  from its discharge into the Narva Bay of the Amur Bay.  Population: 2 (2005 est.).

It was founded in 1924 as Balastny Karyer Sidimi and given its present name in 1972 during the cleansing of Chinese and Asian place names in Primorsky Krai.

References

Rural localities in Primorsky Krai